The Children (Care and Protection) Act 1987 was legislation in New South Wales that dealt with the guardianship and care of children.  It was repealed by section 3 of the Children and Young Persons Legislation (Repeal and Amendment) Act 1998 and replaced with the Children and Young Persons (Care and Protection) Act 1998.

External links
 Austlii - Children and Young Persons Legislation (Repeal and Amendment) Act 1998 - section 3
 Austlii - Children (Care and Protection) Act 1987

1987 in Australian law
New South Wales legislation
Children's rights in Australia
Australian family law
1980s in New South Wales